Silvio Laurenti Rosa (1892–1965) was an Italian film director.

Selected filmography
 Garibaldi e i suoi tempi (1926)
 Shipwrecked (1939)

References

Bibliography
 Moliterno, Gino. Historical Dictionary of Italian Cinema. Scarecrow Press, 2008.

External links

1892 births
1965 deaths
20th-century Italian screenwriters
Italian male screenwriters
Italian film producers
Italian film directors
People from Lazio
20th-century Italian male writers